"Someone to Light Up My Life" (Portuguese: "Se Todos Fossem Iguais A Você", "If Everyone Was Like You") is a song composed by Antônio Carlos Jobim, with lyrics by Vinicius de Moraes. It was written for the play Orfeu da Conceição (1956). English lyrics were added by Gene Lees.

Notable Recordings 
 Elizete Cardoso - Noturno (1957)
 Sylvia Telles - Caricia (1957)
 Charlie Byrd - Brazilian Byrd (1965)
 Antônio Carlos Jobim - A Certain Mr. Jobim (1967), Terra Brasilis (1980)
 Jack Wilson - Song for My Daughter (1969)
 Frank Sinatra and Antônio Carlos Jobim – Sinatra & Company (rec. 1969, released 1971)
 Vinicius de Moraes - En La Fusa con Maria Creuza y Toquinho (1970)
 Tony Bennett - The Good Things in Life (1972)
 Dick Farney - Noite (1981)
 Sylvia Syms - Syms by Sinatra (1982) (orchestrated by Frank Sinatra)
 Kenny Burrell - Groovin' High (1984)
 Mark Murphy - Brazil Songs (1984)
 Gal Costa - Gal Costa Canta Tom Jobim ao Vivo (1999)
 Toninho Horta - To Jobim with Love'' (2008)

See also 

 List of Brazilian songs

References 

1956 songs
Bossa nova songs
Brazilian songs
Portuguese-language songs
Songs with music by Antônio Carlos Jobim
Songs with lyrics by Gene Lees
Songs with lyrics by Vinicius de Moraes